Tianji Subdistrict is a subdistrict in Panji District, Huainan, Anhui. , it administers the following 23 residential communities: 
Tianji Community
Juyuan Community
Heyuan Community
Bihai Community
Kuangbei Community
Taoyuan Community
Baiyun Community
Liwei Community
Lufan Community
Panzhuang Community
Qinzhuang Community
Yangji Community
Zhuantang Community
Liulong Community
Liumiao Community
Yangwei Community
Nanwei Community
Liuwei Community
Wuhu Community
Zhuwei Community
Yangtian Community
Guayuan Community
Lanyuan Community

See also 
 List of township-level divisions of Anhui

References 

Township-level divisions of Anhui
Panji District